Kuhpar or Koohpar or Kuh Par may refer to:
 Kuhpar-e Olya
 Kuhpar-e Sofla